Tall Bireh    is a town in Akkar Governorate, Lebanon.

The population  is mostly Alawite.

History
In 1838, Eli Smith noted  the village as Tell el-Biry,  located north of esh-Sheikh Mohammed. The  inhabitants were Alawites.

References

Bibliography

External links
Tall Bireh, Localiban 

Populated places in Akkar District
Alawite communities in Lebanon